Festival Mall Alabang, formerly known as Festival Supermall and colloquially known as Festi, is a shopping mall owned and operated by Filinvest Land, Inc.The mall is located at Filinvest City (formerly Filinvest Corporate City) in Alabang, Muntinlupa, in the Philippines. The mall opened on May 1, 1998. The mall has a gross floor area of 400,000 square meters and is the fifth largest mall in the Philippines. 

In the first quarter of 2014, the mall completed the initial phase of its upgrading and rebranding efforts that began in 2013. Called the River Park, the initial phase of Festival Supermall’s grand expansion is part of the mall’s four-level expansion to keep up with the current growth in the country’s retail industry.

The Expansion Wing as well as the Water Garden opened in 2017. The Landmark supermarket and food center opened on July 28, 2017. The Landmark Department Store opened on October 6, 2017. The Gold Class Cinemas (2 cinemas) opened on July 25, 2018, on the Third Floor of the Expansion Wing, with each gold class theater having a 186-seating capacity.

Features
The mall features 2 indoor amusement parks, X-Site and Pixie Forest. It also features 8 cinemas (6 in the Main Mall and 2 in the Expansion Wing) and 7 anchor stores that includes Robinsons Department Store, Handyman, Ace Hardware, Savemore Market, Shopwise Supermarket, Automatic Centre and Landmark Department Store. A -year old Art Deco building of Department of Health's Biological Production Service (BPS) research unit was restored and incorporated into the mall in 2009; adjacent to the ruins is a replica statue of José Rizal's The Triumph of Science over Death clay sculpture, sculpted by Genaro Sy-Changco.

References

Shopping malls in Muntinlupa
Real estate companies established in 1998
Retail companies established in 1998
Shopping malls established in 1998
Buildings and structures in Muntinlupa